Ali Sayyad Shirazi (June 1944 – 10 April 1999) was an Iranian regular military (Artesh) officer. He served as commander of the Ground Force during Iran–Iraq War. He was assassinated by Mojahedin-e Khalq in 1999 while serving as the deputy chief of the Iranian Armed Forces General Staff.

Early life
Shirazi was born in Dargaz,Kabud Gonbad Rural District, Iran in June 1944. He was of Afshar descent, his ancestors being from Isthabanat and Neyriz in Fars Province. His grandfather, setting out to Khorasan, settled in Dargaz. Shortly after his birth, his family moved to Mashhad, where they lived for 2 years and later moved to the region of Mazandaran, living in the cities of Gorgan, Amol and Gonbad Kavous. He graduated from Amirkabir High School in Tehran. His father being a non-commissioned officer in the Army motivated him to join and in 1964 he joined as a cadet.

Career
Shirazi was commissioned as a Second Lieutenant in the Artillery and in 1974, he was sent to the United States for further military education. When he returned to Iran he showed opposition to the policies of the Pahlavi government and participated in some street demonstrations. He then joined the opposition movement against the Shah. During the 1979 revolution, he served in the 64th Infantry Division in Urumiyeh. He was later awarded the rank of lieutenant general of the Iranian armed forces.

During the Iran–Iraq War Sayad Shirazi became one of the most important generals of Iran. In 1981, Ayatollah Ruhollah Khomeini appointed him commander of the Ground Forces of the Iranian Army. In 1982, he led the Iranian Pasdaran and Basij soldiers to victory in the Iranian Operation Undeniable Victory, this was the first time Iran was able to defeat Iraq in a major battle, Iran broke through Iraq's "impenetrable" defense lines and expelled them from the Dezful-Shush area, this operation is considered by many as the turning point in the war. During Iran's attempt to capture Basra with Operation Ramadan Shirazi was said: We will continue the war until Saddam Hussein is overthrown so that we can pray at Karbala and Jerusalem.

In 1986, he was named member of the Supreme Defense Council. However, three weeks after this appointment Shirazi was relieved of his post as commander of the ground forces.

In 1988, the People's Mujahedin of Iran with help of Saddam Hussein invaded West-Iran and battled Iranian forces for Kermanshah. Iran's counter offensive, Operation Mersad (led by Shirazi), defeated MEK forces. He also led other successful military operations against Iraq, such as, Operation Zafar 7; and Operation Nasr-4. In 1989, Shirazi was awarded the highest military distinction in the Iranian armed forces, the Fath (Conquest) medal.

When the war concluded, Shirazi was not promoted to major general (unlike his counterparts), but was instead given various staff assignments.

Controversy

A clash and disagreement over strategy to be adopted in the Iran-Iraq war emerged between Shirazi and Mohsen Rezaee, commander of the Revolutionary Guards, in July 1986. When this rivalry became public, Ayatollah Khomeini met them in his residence on 19 July 1986 and urged them to "seek unity", telling them "You must endeavor, not to think in terms of being members of the Armed Forces or those of the Guards Corps or of the Basij forces. ... We must understand that if there were to be any disputes among you ... not only are we doomed here and now, but we also are guilty before God." It remains unclear why, Mohsen Rezaee, who had little military experience was in a technical dispute with a senior general.

Ali Sayyad Shirazi (with Mohsen Rezai, and Ali Akbar Hashemi Rafsanjani) was seen as among "the most hawkish of Iran’s military and civilian leaders, and those who most clearly advocated for continuing the war into Iraq."

Assassination

On 10 April 1999, 6:45 local time, Shirazi was assassinated outside his house while on his way to work. His assassin was disguised as a street sweeper. Ayatollah Ali Khamenei issued a message on Shirazi's martyrdom. Iranian ex-President Khatami described him as "a selfless commander of Islam and honorable son of Iran." A Mujahedeen Khalq spokesman said that Shirazi had been targeted because for "purging and executing military personnel and for the deaths of hundreds of thousands of teen-agers in the Iran-Iraq war of the 1980's, in which he commanded Iran's ground forces."

Legacy

Thousands of people attended his state funeral. Shirazi has had several streets, buildings and military complexes named after him, including a subway station and a highway in Tehran.

See also 

 List of Iranian two-star generals since 1979

References

External links

1944 births
1999 deaths
Islamic Republic of Iran Army personnel of the Iran–Iraq War
Islamic Republic of Iran Army major generals
Assassinated military personnel
Burials at Behesht-e Zahra
Recipients of the Order of Fath
Assassinated Iranian people
Commanders of Islamic Republic of Iran Army Ground Force
People assassinated by the People's Mojahedin Organization of Iran